The Sărata is a left tributary of the river Bașeu in Romania. It discharges into the Bașeu in Mihălășeni.

References

Rivers of Romania
Rivers of Botoșani County
Tributaries of the Bașeu